Conserveira do Sul (loose translation: Canning company of the South) is a Portuguese canned fish and fish processing company, headquartered in Olhão. It was founded in 1954 as a family-run business in the city of Olhão, in the southern Portuguese region of Algarve. In 1996 it relocated its facilities to a modern new unit. Conserveira do Sul produces canned fish products like canned sardines, mackerel, anchovy, tuna and fish roes as well as other specialties such as fish pastes.

See also
Fishing in Portugal

External links
Official website

Food and drink companies of Portugal
Canned food
Olhão